Big Brother is an Australian reality television show, and is the Australian version of the Big Brother franchise. Contestants are referred to as "housemates," and live together in a specially constructed house that is isolated from the outside world. The housemates are continuously monitored during their stay in the house by live television cameras as well as personal audio microphones. Throughout the course of the competition, housemates are evicted from the house. The last remaining housemate wins the competition and is awarded a cash prize. The series began airing in 2001, and as of 2022, 14 seasons and 2 spin-off seasons have been broadcast.

As of Big Brother 14, there have been a total of 287 housemates, ten of which have been housemates on two seasons. There have been 16 winners of Big Brother; twelve men and three women (with one woman winning twice). The youngest winner is Aleisha Lee Cowcher, who was 20 at the time of winning Big Brother 7, and the oldest is Terri Munro, who was 52 when she won Big Brother 8.

Housemates

Key
 Winner
 Runner-up
 Third place
 Walked
 Ejected
 Intruder
 Housemate entered for the second time

Spin-off housemates
Key
 Winner
 Runner-up
 Third place
 Walked
 Ejected
 Housemate entered for the second time

Celebrity Big Brother housemates

Big Brother VIP housemates

Contestants competing in International versions

Big Brother (Australian TV series) contestants
Big Brother (Australian TV series)